Eucyclotoma stegeri, common name Steger's turret, is a species of sea snail, a marine gastropod mollusk in the family Raphitomidae.

Description
The length of the shell varies between 12 mm and 23 mm.

Distribution
E. stegeri can be found in Atlantic waters, ranging from the eastern coast of Florida south to Brazil.; also off French Guiana and Guadeloupe.

References

 McGinty, Thomas L. "New marine mollusks from Florida." Proceedings of the Academy of Natural Sciences of Philadelphia (1955): 75-85.

External links
 
 Rosenberg, G.; Moretzsohn, F.; García, E. F. (2009). Gastropoda (Mollusca) of the Gulf of Mexico, Pp. 579–699 in: Felder, D.L. and D.K. Camp (eds.), Gulf of Mexico–Origins, Waters, and Biota. Texas A&M Press, College Station, Texas
 Gastropods.com: Eucyclotoma stegeri

stegeri
Gastropods described in 1955